Naevala is a genus of fungi in the family Dermateaceae. The genus contains 6 species, including Naevala perexigua. The genus was first established in 1976 by Bernhard Hein.

See also
 List of Dermateaceae genera

References

External links
Naevala at Index Fungorum

Dermateaceae genera